A list of films produced in Brazil in 1937:

See also
 1937 in Brazil

External links
Brazilian films of 1937 at the Internet Movie Database

Lists of 1937 films by country or language
1937
Films